Storia d'amore, internationally released as A Tale of Love and Love Story, is a 1986 Italian drama film directed by Francesco Maselli. 
It entered the 43rd Venice International Film Festival, in which it won the Special Jury Prize and the Volpi Cup for best actress (to Valeria Golino).

Plot

Cast 
 Valeria Golino as Bruna Assecondati
  Blas Roca-Rey as  Sergio
  Livio Panieri as Mario
 Luigi Diberti as  Father of Bruna
 Gabriella Giorgelli as Mother of Sergio

See also
 List of Italian films of 1986

References

External links

1986 films
Italian drama films
Films directed by Francesco Maselli
Films set in Rome
Venice Grand Jury Prize winners
1986 drama films
1980s Italian films